Apache County is in the northeast corner of the U.S. state of Arizona. Shaped in a long rectangle running north to south, as of the 2020 census, its population was 66,021. The county seat is St. Johns.

Most of the county is occupied by part of the federally recognized Navajo Nation and the Fort Apache Indian Reservation, respectively.

History
The United States acquired this territory following its victory in the Mexican–American War in 1848. It was originally part of the New Mexico Territory established at the time. In 1863, during the American Civil War, Congress established the Arizona Territory to improve regional administration. It operated until 1912 when it was admitted as a state.

In 1879 the Tenth Territorial Legislature organized Apache County from the eastern section of Yavapai County; officially all land east of 109°45′ W was included in the new county. As population increased in the area, by 1895, the legislature divided this county to create Navajo County and assigned some of the lands to the newly organized Graham, Greenlee and Gila counties. The county seat was first designated as the town of Snowflake, but a year later it was moved to St. Johns. From 1880 to 1882, the county seat was temporarily in Springerville, before being returned to St. Johns.

An 1896 history of the area described the county by the following:
Apache County was created in 1879 and lies in the northeastern corner of the Territory. Until March, 1895, it also embraced what is now Navajo County, but at that date the latter was set apart and established as a separate county. Apache County is justly noted for its great natural resources and advantages. It is destined some day in the early future to have a large agricultural population. Now, immense herds of cattle and flocks of sheep roam over its broad mesas and its fertile valleys. The Navajo Indians occupy the northern part of the county-in fact, occupy much of the remainder of the county, as they refuse to remain on their reservation, preferring to drive their sheep and cattle on lands outside their reservation, where the grazing is better. The southern part is a fine grazing country, while the northern part is cut up into picturesque gorges and canyons by the floods of past centuries.

In the late 1880s, the county sheriff was Commodore Perry Owens, a legendary Old West gunfighter. In September 1887, near Holbrook in what is now Navajo County, Owens was involved in a famous gunfight: he killed three men and wounded a fourth while serving a warrant on outlaw Andy Blevins/Andy Cooper, a participant in a raging range war, later dubbed the Pleasant Valley War.

In 2015, Apache County had the highest rate of deaths due to motor vehicles in the United States, with 82.5 deaths per 100,000 people.

The Fort Apache Indian Reservation occupies part of the county, as does the Navajo Nation, whose territory extends well beyond it. The Apache and Navajo Nation are federally recognized tribes that long occupied territory here.

Geography

The county is the third-largest county by area in Arizona and the sixth-largest in the United States (excluding boroughs and census areas in Alaska).

Apache County contains parts of each of the Navajo Indian Reservation and the Fort Apache Indian Reservation, and landholdings of the Zuni Indian Reservation that are not contiguous to their main territory. It also contains part of Petrified Forest National Park. Canyon de Chelly National Monument is entirely within the county and within the boundaries of the Navajo Nation.

Adjacent counties

 Greenlee County – south
 Graham County – south
 Navajo County – west
 Montezuma County, Colorado – northeast
 San Juan County, Utah – north
 San Juan County, New Mexico – east
 McKinley County, New Mexico – east
 Cibola County, New Mexico – east
 Catron County, New Mexico – east

Apache County is one of three U.S. counties (the others being Wayne County, West Virginia and Cook County, Illinois) to border two counties of the same name, neither of which is in the same state as the county itself (San Juan County, Utah and San Juan County, New Mexico).

Indian reservations
Apache County has the most land designated as Indian reservation of any county in the United States. (Coconino County and  Navajo County are a close second and third.) The county has  of reservation territory, or 68.34 percent of its total area. The reservations are, in descending order of area within the county, the Navajo Nation, the Fort Apache Indian Reservation, and the Zuni Indian Reservation, all of which are partly located within the county.

National protected areas

 Apache-Sitgreaves National Forest (part)
 Canyon de Chelly National Monument
 Hubbell Trading Post National Historic Site
 Petrified Forest National Park (part)

Demographics

2000 census
As of the census of 2000, there were 69,423 people, 19,971 households, and 15,257 families residing in the county.  The population density was 6 people per square mile (2/km2).  There were 31,621 housing units at an average density of 3 per square mile (1/km2).  The racial makeup of the county was 76.9% Native American, 19.5% White, 0.3% Black or African American, 0.1% Asian, 0.1% Pacific Islander, 1.8% from other races, and 1.4% from two or more races.  4.5% of the population were Hispanic or Latino of any race. 58.4% reported speaking Navajo at home, while 38.4% speak English and 2.7% Spanish  .

There were 19,971 households, out of which 43.8% had children under the age of 18 living with them, 49.3% were married couples living together, 21.4% had a female householder with no husband present, and 23.6% were non-families. 21.2% of all households were made up of individuals, and 6.9% had someone living alone who was 65 years of age or older.  The average household size was 3.41 and the average family size was 4.04.

In the county, the population was spread out, with 38.5% under the age of 18, 9.4% from 18 to 24, 25.1% from 25 to 44, 18.7% from 45 to 64, and 8.0% who were 65 years of age or older.  The median age was 27 years. For every 100 females there were 98.20 males.  For every 100 females age 18 and over, there were 94.50 males.

The median income for a household in the county was $23,344, and the median income for a family was $26,315. Males had a median income of $30,182 versus $22,312 for females. The per capita income for the county was $8,986.  About 33.5% of families and 37.8% of the population were below the poverty line, including 42.8% of those under age 18 and 36.5% of those age 65 or over. The county's per-capita income makes it one of the poorest counties in the United States.

Apache County is one of only 38 county-level census divisions of the United States where the most spoken language is not English and one of only 3 where it is neither English nor Spanish. 58.3% of the population speak Navajo at home, followed by English at 38.3% and Spanish at 2.7%.

In 2000, the largest denominational group was the Catholics (with 19,965 adherents). The largest religious bodies were The Catholic Church (with 19,965 members) and the Church of Jesus Christ of Latter-day Saints (with 8,947 members).

2010 census
As of the census of 2010, there were 71,518 people, 22,771 households, and 16,331 families residing in the county. The racial makeup of the county was 72.9% Native American, 23.3% white, 0.3% Asian, 0.2% black or African American, 1.3% from other races, and 2.0% from two or more races. Those of Hispanic or Latino origin made up 5.8% of the population.

The largest ancestry groups were:

 69.6% Navajo
 5.4% English
 5.3% German
 4.2% Irish
 4.0% Mexican
 1.4% American
 1.1% Scottish
 1.0% French
 1.0% Polish

Of the 22,771 households, 42.3% had children under the age of 18 living with them, 42.8% were married couples living together, 21.2% had a female householder with no husband present, 28.3% were non-families, and 24.8% of all households were made up of individuals. The average household size was 3.10 and the average family size was 3.76. The median age was 32.4 years.

The median income for a household in the county was $30,184 and the median income for a family was $36,915. Males had a median income of $38,451 versus $31,557 for females. The per capita income for the county was $12,294. About 26.9% of families and 34.4% of the population were below the poverty line, including 41.8% of those under age 18 and 29.2% of those age 65 or over.

Politics
The majority Native American population votes solidly for Democratic national candidates and generally helps carry the county for their presidential candidates. No Republican presidential nominee has won Apache County since Ronald Reagan in 1980, when incumbent President Jimmy Carter was viewed as extremely weak on issues pertaining to the West, especially water development. During most of the 1980s, 1990s and early 2000s Apache was the most Democratic county in Arizona. Concern by voters in Santa Cruz County, Arizona about Republican immigration policies has led to it voting Democratic at an even higher rate.

Education

Primary and secondary schools
The following school districts serve Apache County:

 Alpine Elementary School District
 Chinle Unified School District
 Concho Elementary School District
 Ganado Unified School District
 McNary Elementary School District
 Red Mesa Unified School District
 Round Valley Unified School District
 Sanders Unified School District
 St Johns Unified School District
 Vernon Elementary School District
 Window Rock Unified School District

In addition several other schools, including charter schools and tribal schools operated by or affiliated with the Bureau of Indian Education (BIE), serve the county.
 Many Farms High School (BIE-operated)
 Many Farms Community School
 Hunters Point Boarding School

Charter schools:
 New Visions Academy

Private schools:
 St. Michael Indian School (Roman Catholic Diocese of Gallup)

Public libraries
The Apache County Library District, headquartered in St. Johns, operates public libraries in the county. The branches include Alpine Public Library (unincorporated area), Concho Public Library (unincorporated area), Greer Memorial Library (unincorporated area), Round Valley Public Library (Eagar), Sanders Public Library (unincorporated area), St. Johns Public Library (St. Johns), and Vernon Public Library (unincorporated area).

The Navajo Nation Museum and Library is located in Window Rock. The library and museum is the largest one on the Navajo Nation and in Apache County.

Transportation

Major highways

  Interstate 40
  U.S. Route 60
  U.S. Route 64
  U.S. Route 180
  U.S. Route 191
  State Route 61
  State Route 260
  State Route 264

Airports
The following public use airports are located in Apache County:
 Chinle – Chinle Municipal Airport (E91)
 Springerville – Springerville Municipal Airport (D68)
 St. Johns – St. Johns Industrial Air Park (SJN)
 Window Rock – Window Rock Airport (RQE)

Communities

City
 St. Johns (county seat)

Towns
 Eagar
 Springerville

Census-designated places

 Alpine
 Burnside
 Chinle
 Concho
 Cornfields
 Cottonwood
 Del Muerto
 Dennehotso
 Fort Defiance
 Ganado
 Greer
 Houck
 Klagetoh
 Lukachukai
 Lupton
 Many Farms
 McNary
 Nazlini
 Nutrioso
 Oak Springs
 Red Mesa
 Red Rock
 Rock Point
 Rough Rock
 Round Rock
 St. Michaels
 Sanders
 Sawmill
 Sehili
 Steamboat
 Teec Nos Pos
 Toyei
 Tsaile
 Vernon
 Wide Ruins
 Window Rock

Unincorporated communities

 Adamana
 Blue Gap
 Chambers
 Hunters Point
 Mexican Water
 Navajo Springs
 White Clay

County population ranking
The population ranking of the following table is based on the 2010 census of Apache County.

† county seat

Notable people
 Berard Haile
 Cormac Antram
 Don Lorenzo Hubbell
 Anselm Weber
 Rex E. Lee
 David King Udall
 Ida Hunt Udall
 Mo Udall
 Stewart Udall
 William Cooper
 John Wayne
 Henry Chee Dodge
 Joe Shirley Jr.
 Annie Dodge Wauneka

See also

 National Register of Historic Places listings in Apache County, Arizona
List of counties in Arizona

References

External links

 Apache County Website

 
Arizona placenames of Native American origin
1879 establishments in Arizona Territory
Populated places established in 1879